Saneroite is a silicate mineral found in Italy. It is named after Edoardo Sanero, a professor at the University of Genova. It is a triclinic mineral with space group symmetry P.

References

Inosilicates
Triclinic minerals
Minerals in space group 2